Noakhali Science and Commerce School and College (NSCSC) was founded in 2009 by Aftab Uddin.
NSCSC has two campuses, one in Maijdee, and one in Sonapur.

References 

Colleges in Noakhali District
Schools in Noakhali District
2009 establishments in Bangladesh